"Kimi to Dance Dance Dance / My Lady (Fuyu no Koibito)" is the second Japanese single by South Korean boy band Boyfriend. This single is another original song and was released digitally on November 28, 2012.

Videography

Track listing

Charts

Oricon

Other Charts

References

Japanese-language songs
2012 songs
Starship Entertainment singles
Songs about dancing